The Eden Gardens is a cricket ground in Kolkata, India. Established in 1864, it is the oldest and second-largest cricket stadium in India and third-largest in the world. The stadium currently has a capacity of 66,000.

Eden Gardens is often referred to as home of Indian cricket and has also been described as "cricket's answer to the Colosseum"  and called the "Mecca of Indian cricket", due to it being the first purpose-built ground for the sport. Eden Gardens has hosted matches in major international competitions including the World Cup, World Twenty20 and Asia Cup. In 1987, Eden Gardens became the second stadium to host a World Cup final. The 2016 ICC World Twenty20 final was held at the stadium, with the West Indies beating England in a closely fought encounter. Eden Gardens record crowd 110,564 in 1996 India Vs Sri Lanka Cricket World Cup Semi Final.

Stadium history

The stadium was established in 1864. The origins of its name are uncertain. According to some, the stadium is named after the Eden Gardens park where it is located, itself named after the Eden sisters, Emily and Fanny, of Lord Auckland, the Governor-General of India (1836–1842). Initially named the 'Auckland Circus Gardens', the park was renamed to the 'Eden Gardens' in 1841.  

However, according to popular culture, Babu Rajchandra Das, the zamindar (landlord) of Kolkata, gifted one of his biggest gardens, Mar Bagan, besides the river Hooghly, to Lord Auckland and his sister Emily Eden in gratitude for their help in saving his third daughter from a fatal disease. The garden was then renamed to the Eden Gardens. 

The cricket grounds were built between Babughat and Fort William. The stadium is in the B. B. D. Bagh area of the city, near the State Secretariat and across the Calcutta High Court.

The first Test match at the venue was held in 1934 between England and India, its first One Day International in 1987 between India and Pakistan and its first T20 international in 2011 between India and England. The 1993 Hero Cup semi-final featuring India and South Africa was the first day/night match. 

The stadium also hosted matches of the inaugural edition of Nehru Cup in 1982.  The Eden Gardens also hosted the India versus Uruguay football match in 1984 Nehru Cup.

1980 Stampede 
16 people were killed in a stampede and riot inside Eden Gardens during a Mohun Bagan-East Bengal Calcutta Football League (CFL) match on 16 August 1980.

Stadium 
The stadium is the headquarters of the Cricket Association of Bengal. Apart from International matches, the stadium hosts the Bengal cricket team and the Kolkata Knight Riders Indian Premier League franchise. The stadium's Club House is named after former Chief Minister of West Bengal Dr. B. C. Roy.

1987 renovation 
The stadium's capacity was expanded to 100,000 from 40,000 for the 1987 World Cup. The expansion also included renovations to the press ure. 42 columns were added to provide the support for large roofs and multi-tiered covered stands. Even after the renovation, not all seats were covered and many sections lacked individual seats.

However, match day attendance of more than 100,000 spectators has been recorded on at least 6 occasions until the early 2000s.

2011 renovation
Eden Gardens underwent renovation for the 2011 Cricket World Cup. Renovation had been undertaken to meet the standards set by the International Cricket Council (ICC) for the 2011 World Cup. The Cricket Association of Bengal hired a consortium of Philadelphia-based Burt Hill Architects and Ahmedabad-based VMS architecture firms for a two-year project to renovate the stadium. The plans for the renovated stadium included a new clubhouse and players' facilities, upgrades of the exterior walls to give the stadium a new look, cladding the existing roof structure with a new metal skin, new/upgraded patron amenities & signage and general infrastructure improvements. The upgrade also meant reduction of the seating capacity to about 68,000 from around 94,000 before the upgrade.

Due to unsafe conditions arising from the incomplete renovations, the ICC withdrew the India vs. England match from the Eden Gardens. This match, scheduled on 27 February 2011, was played in Bengaluru at M.Chinnaswamy Stadium.

The stadium hosted the remaining three scheduled World Cup 2011 Matches on 15, 18 and 20 March 2011. In the last of these three matches (Kenya vs Zimbabwe), the stadium had the lowest ticket-purchasing crowd in its recorded history with 15 spectators having bought tickets.

Stands
Eden Gardens stands have been named after prominent local cricketers and soldiers. On 22 January 2017, two stands were named after Indian cricketers - Sourav Ganguly and Pankaj Roy while two more were after cricket administrators - BN Dutt (BCCI President 1988 to 1990) and Jagmohan Dalmiya (BCCI President 2001–04, 2013 - interim, 2015). Dalmiya served as ICC President from 1997 to 2000.

On 27 April 2017, 4 stands were named after Indian soldiers - Colonel Neelakantan Jayachandran Nair, Havildar Hangpan Dada, Lieutenant Colonel Dhan Singh Thapa and Subedar Joginder Singh Sahnan. LC Thapa and Subedar Singh are Param Vir Chakra awardees - the highest wartime military decoration in India while Col Nair and Havildar Dada are Ashok Chakra - the highest peacetime military decoration.

Experience

Eden Gardens is renowned for its large and passionate crowds. Former Aussie captain Steve Waugh considers the Eden Gardens as 'Lord's of the subcontinent'. Dileep Vengsarkar called Eden Gardens as the second best after Lords. Former Indian Captain and Kolkata-native Sourav Ganguly confessed once in an interview that the roar of crowd at the stadium he heard when India defeated Australia in the Second Test of 2000–01 Border–Gavaskar Trophy was the loudest he had ever heard.

In 2016, a bell was added to the stadium to ring in the start of day's play for test cricket and start of match for ODI & T20I matches. Kapil Dev was the first person to ring the bell to start the test match between India and New Zealand in September 2016.

Cricket World Cup matches

Eden Gardens has hosted 15 Cricket World Cup matches hosted in India across formats and men's and women's cricket. Eden Gardens has hosted 6 Cricket World Cup matches in 1987 (2), 1996 (1), 2011 (3). The stadium hosted 5 T20I matches during 2016 ICC World Twenty20. The stadium hosted 2 Women's Cricket World Cup matches - one each in 1978 and 1997 and one Women T20I match during the 2016 ICC Women's World Twenty20 tournament.

Eden Gardens has hosted 4 finals (1987 ODI CWC, 2016 T20I, 1997 Women's CWC and 2016 Women's T20I) and 1 semi-final (1996 ODI CWC).

1987 ICC Cricket World Cup

1996 ICC Cricket World Cup

2011 ICC Cricket World Cup 
Eden Gardens was meant to host a Group B Match between India and England on 27 February 2011. The ICC, however, stripped the stadium of the match after deciding that the renovation of the grounds would not be completed in time.

2016 ICC World Twenty20

1978 ICC Women's Cricket World Cup

1997 ICC Women's Cricket World Cup

2016 ICC Women's World Twenty20

First day/night test

Notable events
 

 In 1946, an in-form Syed Mushtaq Ali was dropped from the Indian team selected to play an unofficial test against Australian Services XI. Following crowd protests (with slogans like "No Mushtaq, No Test"), the selectors brought him back to play.
 Rioting occurred at the ground during the 1966/67 West Indies and 1969/70 Australian tours.
 In 1977, New York Cosmos played a Football match against Mohun Bagan at the stadium. Pelé played in that match for the Cosmos. The match was drawn at 2–2.
 16 football fans died in a stampede after a derby league game between East Bengal and Mohun Bagan on 16 August 1980.
 Hosted Nehru Cup in 1984, where India national football team played against Argentina, Poland, China PR, Romania U-21 and Vasas Budapest.
 Eden Gardens hosted the 1987 Cricket World Cup Final which was first ever Cricket World Cup final hosted outside England. The match ended with Australia defeating England by 7 runs. This was first time Australia won the Cricket World Cup Final.
 The 1996 World Cup semi-final was called off and Sri Lanka awarded the match after crowd disturbances following an Indian batting collapse.
 During the second final of the 1997 Pepsi Independence Cup, the Test and ODI captains of the Indian cricket team of all time (with a few notable exceptions) were given a lap of honour around the stadium.
 In 1999, leading Indian batsman Sachin Tendulkar was run out after colliding with Pakistan's Shoaib Akhtar. Akhtar had impeded Tendulkar and the crowd rioted, forcing the police to evict the spectators. The match continued in front of an empty stadium.
 Kapil Dev took an ODI hat-trick against the Sri Lankans in 1991 at the ground.
 Harbhajan Singh took a hat-trick against Australia in 2000/01 at the ground. He became the first Indian to take a hat-trick in Test cricket.
In 2000/01, V.V.S. Laxman scored 281 against Australia in the Second Test, 2000–01 Border–Gavaskar Trophy. This remains the highest score at the ground. He was involved in a memorable 376 runs partnership with Rahul Dravid who scored 180. They batted through the whole day 4 of the test match without losing their wickets. Australia were defeated despite enforcing the follow-on. It was only the third time in Test history that a team had won after being forced to follow on. It is widely considered to be one of the greatest Test matches in cricket history.
In 2005, in an ODI against South Africa, the Eden Gardens crowd booed the Indian team and Greg Chappell because of Sourav Ganguly's dropping from the team. Chappell was alleged to have made an obscene gesture towards the crowd from the team bus prior to the match.
In 2005, Sachin Tendulkar scored his 10,000th run in Test Cricket against Pakistan on this ground making him the second Indian batsman and fifth overall to achieve this feat.
 Eden Gardens hosted the historic 199th (penultimate) Test match of Sachin Tendulkar's career against West Indies from 6-10 Nov 2013. India defeated West Indies by an innings and 51 runs in 3 days.
 On its 150th anniversary, on 13 November 2014, Eden Gardens witnessed the highest ever score by a batsman in One Day Internationals, a 264 off 173 balls scored by Rohit Sharma during the fourth One Day International of Sri Lanka vs India at the venue.
On 3 April 2016, in this venue, within a span of hours, the finals of the ICC world cup Twenty20 tournaments for the women and for the men were won by the respective women's and men's teams of the West Indies.
The stadium hosted the 200th and 250th home tests for India in 2005 and 2016 respectively.
 On 22 January 2017, Ravindra Jadeja became the first Indian left arm spinner to take 150 One Day International wickets, when he dismissed Sam Billings.
On 21 September 2017, Kuldeep Yadav became the third bowler for India to take a hat-trick in an ODI after Chetan Sharma and Kapil Dev. When he took a hat-trick against Australia.
On 22 November 2019, India's first ever day/night test match between India and Bangladesh was hosted at Eden Gardens and the game was inaugurated jointly by the Chief Minister of West Bengal, Mamata Banerjee and the President of Bangladesh, Abdul Hamid.

Stats and records

Matches hosted
()
 Test — 41
 ODI — 30
 T20I — 9

Records
 The most runs in Test Matches played here are scored by V.V.S. Laxman (1217 runs), followed by Rahul Dravid (962 runs) and Sachin Tendulkar (872 runs). The most wickets taken here was by Harbhajan Singh (46 wickets) followed by Anil Kumble (40 wickets) and Bishen Singh Bedi (29 wickets).
 The most runs in ODIs scored here by a batsman is by Sachin Tendulkar (496 runs), followed by Mohammed Azharuddin (332 runs) and Virat Kohli (326 runs). The most wickets taken here is by Anil Kumble and Kapil Dev (14 wickets each), followed by Ravindra Jadeja (9 wickets).
 VVS Laxman and Mohammed Azharuddin have scored 5 centuries each at this venue.
 The highest ever ODI individual score of 264 is made by Rohit Sharma on this ground against Sri Lanka in 2014.
On 21 September 2017, Kuldeep Yadav became the third bowler for India to take a hat-trick in an ODI after Chetan Sharma and Kapil Dev. When he took a hat trick against Australia.
The highest runs ever scored in IPL at Eden Gardens were scored on 28 April 2019. This was achieved by Kolkata Knight Riders against Mumbai Indians. The score was 232/2. MI Scored 198/7 After Hardik Pandya Scored 91(34) Deliveries handing KKR its 100th T20 win.
The lowest total in the history of IPL - RCB (49/10)

See also
 List of international cricket centuries at Eden Gardens
 List of international cricket five-wicket hauls at Eden Gardens
 List of stadiums by capacity

References

External links

  Eden Gardens Cricket Stadium Kolkata, India – Eden Gardens Cricket Stadium Seating Layout
 CricketArchive statistics for Eden gardens
 IPL-5 Matches at Eden Gardens – IPL 2012 Matches at Eden Gardens

Test cricket grounds in India
India
Sports venues completed in 1864
Sports venues in Kolkata
Cricket grounds in West Bengal
Football venues in West Bengal
Cricket in Kolkata
1987 Cricket World Cup stadiums
1996 Cricket World Cup stadiums
2011 Cricket World Cup stadiums
1864 establishments in India